Coka is a town in Banbar County, Chamdo Prefecture, in the east of the Tibet Autonomous Region, China. It lies just  to the southwest of Banbar, and is serviced by Tibet Regional Highway 303 (S303).

Administrative divisions
The township contains the following village-level divisions:
Dongtuo Community 	
Geji Village 	
Wangka Village 	
Suocun Village	 	
Laiyi Village 	
Latuo Village 	
Cangba Village	 	
Zhuogui Village 	
Changsha Village 	
Maijia Village	() 	
Dagen Village	() 	
Lagong Village  	
Danda Village 	
Sudong Village	 

References

Township-level divisions of Tibet
Populated places in Chamdo
Banbar County